San Ignacio de Moxos (or San Ignacio) is a town  in the Beni Department of northern Bolivia.

History
San Ignacio de Moxos was founded in 1689 by the Jesuit missionaries Antonio de Orellana, Juan de Espejo and Alvaro de Mendoza. Its first location was 20 miles south of the current location of San Ignacio.

Geography

San Ignacio is the capital of the Moxos Province and is situated at an elevation of 144 m above sea level at Laguna Isiboro, a lake of 20 km² west of the town. San Ignacio is located 100 km south-west of Trinidad, the department's capital.

San Ignacio de Moxos is located in the wettest region of the Beni department, situated on the border between the Amazon rainforests of the Chapare region, and the monsoonal llanos of western Santa Cruz and southwestern Beni. While San Ignacio de Moxos experiences a short dry season, rain is plentiful year round, and temperatures are generally warm to hot. The area has a tropical monsoon climate according to the Köppen Classification System, bordering on a tropical rainforest climate.

Population
The town population has risen from 4,832 (census 1992) to 9,064 (census 2001) and 10,054 (census 2012).

Languages
Camba Spanish is the primary vernacular lingua franca spoken in the town. Ignaciano, a Moxo dialect, is the main indigenous language spoken.

Government
The current mayor of San Ignacio de Moxos is Basilio Nolvani Nojune (of the MAS-IPSP party), who was elected in the 4 April 2010 elections and took office in late May 2010.

Gallery

See also 
Villa Tunari – San Ignacio de Moxos Highway

References

External links
Detailed map of Moxos Province

Populated places in Beni Department
Populated places established in 1689
1689 establishments in the Spanish Empire
Jesuit Missions of Moxos